Rome is an unincorporated community in southern Douglas County, Missouri, United States.

History
In 1840 Wright's Mill, built by James Wright, was at the location and was perhaps the earliest grist mill on Beaver Creek. Circa 1850, the Lawrence Mill, built by William Lawrence, was at the same location.

During the Civil War, Rome was the location of Lawrence Mill. Union forces built a blockhouse to defend the location. Fort Lawrence consisted of a two-story building or stockade with dimensions of 100 by 40 feet and was defended by militiamen or "Missouri home guards". Forces under the command of Confederate General Marmaduke attacked and burned the fort in January 1863 while on their way to Springfield.

Rome previously had its own post office from 1888–1957. The community was named after Rome, in Italy.

References

Unincorporated communities in Douglas County, Missouri
Unincorporated communities in Missouri